Gasper George Urban (March 18, 1923 – May 17, 1998) was an American football guard who played one season with the Chicago Rockets of the All-America Football Conference. He was drafted by the  Los Angeles Rams in the 17th round of the 1946 NFL Draft. He played college football at the University of Notre Dame and attended Lynn Classical High School in Lynn, Massachusetts.

References

External links
Just Sports Stats

1923 births
1998 deaths
Players of American football from Massachusetts
American football guards
Notre Dame Fighting Irish football players
Chicago Rockets players
Sportspeople from Lynn, Massachusetts